The Pepiri-Guazu River (Spanish Río Pepirí Guazú, Portuguese Rio Peperi Guaçu) is a river of Argentina and the Santa Catarina state in southeastern Brazil. For its entire course, it forms a short portion of the international border between Argentina and Brazil. It flows from north to south into the Uruguay River.

See also
List of rivers of Argentina
List of rivers of Santa Catarina

References

 Rand McNally, The New International Atlas, 1993.
 Map from Ministry of Transport

Rivers of Argentina
Rivers of Paraná (state)
Rivers of Santa Catarina (state)
International rivers of South America
Argentina–Brazil border
Tributaries of the Uruguay River
Rivers of Misiones Province
Border rivers